The 454th Flying Training Squadron is an inactive United States Air Force unit.  It was last assigned to the 323d Flying Training Wing at Mather Air Force Base, California, where it was inactivated on 1 October 1993.

History

World War II

Activated as a Martin B-26 Marauder medium bomber squadron; trained under Third Air Force in the southeastern United States.   Deployed to European Theater of Operations ; assigned to VIII Bomber Command, 3d Bombardment Division in England.   Engaged in combat operations over France and the Low Countries, attacking enemy military targets; formations; airfields; railroads; bridges and other raids to disrupt enemy defences.   Coordinated raids with VIII Bomber Command heavy strategic bombardment of military and industrial targeted in Nazi Germany and in Occupied Europe by striking Luftwaffe day interceptor airfields to cause maximum disruption of air defenses when heavy bomber groups were returning from bombardment raids.   Destroyed support buildings; barracks and enemy aircraft on the ground.

After D-Day invasion of Europe, engaged in tactical air support of Allied ground forces, carrying out bombardment attacks against enemy strong points, structures and targets of opportunity when making sweeps of enemy rear areas.  Moved from England to Advanced Landing Grounds in France and further eastward as ground forces advanced across continent; engaging enemy targets during the Western Allied invasion of Germany in early 1945.   Continued combat operations until German capitulation in May 1945.

Became part of the United States Air Forces in Europe forces in Occupied Germany; summer 1945.   Demobilized in Germany in November and squadron inactivated as a paper unit in the United States.

Reserve operations
Reactivated as a Douglas B-26 Invader reserve light bomber squadron in 1947.   Trained in the reserves; mobilized in 1951 due to the Korean War.   Personnel and aircraft reassigned to other units and squadron inactivated.

Fighter-Bomber operations
Reactivated as the 454th Fighter-Bomber Squadron, a Tactical Air Command fighter squadron in 1955; inactivated in 1957 due to budget reductions.

Navigator training
Reactivated by Air Training Command as a navigator training squadron in 1972; inactivated with the closure of Mather Air Force Base and the inactivation of its host unit in 1993.

Lineage
 Constituted as the 454th Bombardment Squadron (Medium) on 19 June 1942
 Activated on 4 August 1942
 Redesignated 454th Bombardment Squadron, Medium c.20 August 1943
 Inactivated on 26 November 1945
 Redesignated 454th Bombardment Squadron, Light on 9 September 1947
 Activated in the reserve on 26 September 1947
 Ordered to active service 10 March 1951
 Inactivated on 17 March 1951.
 Redesignated 454th Fighter-Bomber Squadron on 9 May 1955
 Activated on 8 August 1955
 Inactivated on 1 September 1957
 Redesignated 454th Flying Training Squadron and activated on 1 April 1973
 Inactivated on 1 October 1993

Assignments
 323d Bombardment Group, 4 August 1942 – 26 November 1945
 323d Bombardment Group, 26 September 1947 – 17 March 1951
 323d Fighter-Bomber Group, 8 August 1955 – 1 September 1957
 323d Flying Training Wing, 1 April 1973 – 1 October 1993

Stations

 Columbia Army Air Base, South Carolina, 4 August 1942
 MacDill Field, Florida, 21 August 1942
 Myrtle Beach Bombing Range, South Carolina, 2 November 1942 – 25 April 1943
 RAF Horham (AAF-119), England, 1 May 1943
 RAF Earls Colne (AAF-358), England, 14 June 1943
 RAF Beaulieu (AAF-408), England, 21 July 1944
 Lessay Airfield (A-20), France, 26 August 1944
 Chartres Airfield (A-40), France, 21 September 1944
 Laon/Athies Airfield (A-69), France, 13 October 1944

 Denain/Prouvy Airfield (A-83), France, 9 February 1945
 Innsbruck, Austria, c. 15 May 1945
 AAF Station Nesselwang, Germany, 9 July 1945
 AAF Station Schongau (R-79), Germany, c. July 1945
 Clastres Airfield, France, October – c. 12 December 1945
 Camp Myles Standish, Massachusetts, 11–12 December 1945
 Tinker Air Force Base, Oklahoma, 26 September 1947 – 17 March 1951
 Bunker Hill Air Force Base, Indiana, 8 August 1955 – 1 September 1957
 Mather Air Force Base, California, 1 April 1973 – 1 October 1993

Aircraft
 Martin B-26 Marauder, 1942–1945
 Douglas B-26 Invader, 1947–1951
 North American F-86 Sabre, 1955–1956
 North American F-100 Super Sabre, 1957-1957
 Convair T-29 Flying Classroom 1973-1975
 Boeing T-43 1973-1993

References

Notes
 Explanatory notes

 Citations

Bibliography

 
 
 
 

0454
Military units and formations established in 1973
Military units and formations disestablished in 1993